is an art museum in the city of Akita.

The original Akita Prefectural Museum of Art was opened on May 5, 1967. The new  museum was opened on September 28, 2013. The main exhibit is a collection of works by Tsuguharu Foujita from the collection of the Masakichi Hirano Art Foundation. The museum has two additional galleries for rotating exhibitions. The triangular-shaped building was designed by award-winning architect Tadao Ando.

References

External links

  Akita Museum of Art

Museums in Akita Prefecture
Buildings and structures in Akita (city)
Art museums and galleries in Japan
Prefectural museums
Art museums established in 1967
1967 establishments in Japan
Tadao Ando buildings
Art museums established in 2013